Employee of the Month EP is the third EP released by Relient K. Tracks 1 and 2 are from the band's subsequent third album, Two Lefts Don't Make a Right...but Three Do. Track 6 is from the band's second album, The Anatomy of the Tongue in Cheek.

The packaging depicts each member of Relient K as an employee of the month. Matt Thiessen, Matt Hoopes, Dave Douglas and Brian Pittman for May, June, July and August accordingly. The album cover shows Aaron Marrs, a friend of the band, as the Employee of the Month for September.

Marrs was a part of the design and/or layout of many of the album covers for the band, including this EP's cover and the cover of Two Lefts Don't Make a Right...but Three Do. He passed K away in January 2005, and therefore, Relient K dedicated the Apathetic EP to him.

Track listing
All songs written by Matt Thiessen

 "Trademark" – 4:00
 "In Love With the 80s (Pink Tux to the Prom)" – 3:09
 "Wit's All Been Done Before" – 3:30
 "A Penny Loafer Saved, A Penny Loafer Earned" – 2:25
 "For the Band" – 4:23
 "Failure to Excommunicate" – 3:37

Credits 

 Matt Thiessen – lead vocals, guitar, piano
 Matt Hoopes – guitar, backing vocals
 Brian Pittman – bass guitar
 Dave Douglas – drums, backing vocals

References

Relient K EPs
2002 EPs
Gotee Records EPs